The 2019 AMF Futsal Men's World Cup was the 12th edition of the AMF Futsal World Cup. The tournament was held in Argentina from 31 March to 7 April in the cities of Montecarlo, Posadas, Eldorado and Oberá. Sixteen national teams from all confederations participated in the tournament.

Rankings

References

External links
Official website

AMF Futsal World Cup
2019 in futsal
International futsal competitions hosted by Argentina
2019 in Argentine football
AMF Futsal Men's World Cup
AMF Futsal Men's World Cup